Bachman may refer to:

Bachman (surname)
Bachman, Ohio
Bachman, West Virginia
Bachman Khan (1210–1239 or 1240), a Kimak khan
Bachmann knot, often used in mountaineering for ascending on ropes
Bachman Station, a train station on the Dallas Area Rapid Transit Green and Orange Lines

See also 

Bachmann
Backman